Hannah Marshall (born 6 July 1982) is a British artist and founder of the experiential art studio H+

Engineered with minimalist precision, Marshall's practice intersects architecture, science and sound. Building installation art to invite deeper listening and amplify human connection. Marshall's creative DNA is marked by aesthetic and spiritual hybridity. Deploying her signature black and light, she continually explores the relationship between permanence and impermanence, silence and sound. 

In December 2022, Marshall was a guest speaker at FutureSound with spacial audio brand L-Acoustics to speak about the power of sound and the voice. 

Marshall is a visionary and creates compelling culturally important work that cuts through the noise for brands including London Borough of Culture, The British Museum, Soho House, Superblue and RE-TEXTURED a multi-venue, multi-sensory festival. Since 2012, Marshall has been on the expert council for CoolBrands. Also, she has worked with music artists including Florence and The Machine, Anna Calvi, Goldfrapp, The xx, Róisín Murphy, Janet Jackson, MØ, Jessie Ware, Nina Kraviz and Savages.

On 2 January 2017 a post on Instagram from The xx's member Romy Madley-Croft reveals that Marshall's proposal and engagement. but are no longer in a relationship.

References

External links
 

1982 births
Living people
British artists
People from Colchester
British fashion designers